The 2002 European Athletics Indoor Championships were held from Friday, 1 March to Sunday, 3 March 2002 in Vienna, the capital city of Austria. This was the last edition to be held in an even year to avoid it occurring in the same year as the outdoor European Athletics Championships.

Results

Men

Women

Medal table

Participating nations

 (3)
 (2)
 (1)
 (33)
 (2)
 (12)
 (10)
 (2)
 (12)
 (8)
 (8)
 (24)
 (5)
 (5)
 (9)
 (41)
 (1)
 (27)
 (21)
 (17)
 (17)
 (2)
 (14)
 (4)
 (28)
 (4)
 (3)
 (1)
 (3)
 (2)
 (12)
 (4)
 (24)
 (18)
 (12)
 (56)
 (1)
 (10)
 (21)
 (35)
 (16)
 (6)
 (7)
 (11)
 (4)

References
 Athletix

 
European Athletics Indoor Championships
A
European Indoor Athletics Championships
A
A
2000s in Vienna
March 2002 sports events in Europe